The Best of The Dubliners is a UK 1967 compilation album by The Dubliners. It charted at No. 25 and remained in the top 40 chart in the UK for nearly three months.

Charts

References

1967 compilation albums
The Dubliners compilation albums